Excuse Me is a 1915 American comedy silent black and white film directed by Henry W. Savage, written by Rupert Hughes and distributed by Pathé Exchange.

Cast
 George F. Marion as Porter
 Geraldine O'Brien as Marjorie Newton
 Vivian Blackburn as Mrs. Jim Wellington
 Robert Fischer as Jim Wellington
 Harrison Ford as Lt. Harry Mallory
 J.B. Hollis

References

External links
 
 

Silent American comedy films
1915 comedy films
1915 films
American silent feature films
American black-and-white films
Films based on works by Rupert Hughes
Pathé Exchange films
1910s American films